In Modern English, I is the singular, first-person pronoun.

Morphology 

In Standard Modern English, I has five distinct word forms:

 I: the nominative (subjective) form
I is the only pronoun form that is always capitalized in English. This practice became established in the late 15th century, though lowercase i was sometimes found as late as the 17th century.
 me: the accusative (objective) forms (the accusative case is also called the 'oblique'.)
 my: the dependent genitive (possessive) form
 mine: the independent genitive
 myself: the reflexive form

History
Old English had a first-person pronoun that inflected for four cases and three numbers. I originates from Old English (OE) , which had in turn originated from the continuation of Proto-Germanic *ik, and ek; The asterisk denotes an unattested form, but ek was attested in the Elder Futhark inscriptions (in some cases notably showing the variant eka; see also ek erilaz). Linguists assume ik to have developed from the unstressed variant of ek. Variants of ic were used in various English dialects up until the 1600s. The Proto-Germanic root came, in turn, from the Proto Indo-European language (PIE) *eg-.

*Early OE circa , late, and ME

Mine is from Proto-Germanic *minaz, and my is a reduced form of mine. All of these are from PIE root *me-.

Syntax

Functions 
I can appear as a subject, object, determiner, or predicative complement. The reflexive form also appears as an adjunct. Me occasionally appears as a modifier in a noun phrase.

 Subject: I'm here; me being here; my being there; I paid for myself to be here.
 Object: She saw me; She introduced him to me; I saw myself.
 Predicative complement: The only person there was me / I.
 Dependent determiner: I met my friend.
 Independent determiner: This is mine.
 Adjunct: I did it myself.
 Modifier: the me generation

Coordinative constructions

The above applies when the pronoun stands alone as the subject or object. In some varieties of English (particularly in formal registers), those rules also apply in coordinative constructions such as "you and I".
 "My husband and I wish you a merry Christmas."
 "Between you and me..."

In many dialects of informal English, the accusative is sometimes used when the pronoun is part of a coordinative subject construction, as in
 "Phil and me wish you a merry Christmas."
This is stigmatized but common in many dialects.

Dependents 
Pronouns rarely take dependents, but it is possible for me to have many of the same kind of dependents as other noun phrases.

 Relative clause modifier: the me I'd like to be; *me I'd like to be
 Determiner: the me I'd like to be; *the me
 Adjective phrase modifier: the real me
 Adverb phrase external modifier: Not even me

Semantics 
I's referents are limited to the individual person speaking or writing, the first person. I is always definite and specific.

Pronunciation 
According to the OED, the following pronunciations are used:

Notes

References

Bibliography
 
 
 

 "Etymology of I". Online Etymology Dictionary. Douglas Harper, n.d. Web. 12 Dec. 2010. 
 "Etymology of Me". Online Etymology Dictionary. Douglas Harper, n.d. Web. 12 Dec. 2010. 
 Halleck, Elaine (editor). "Sum: Pronoun "I" again". LINGUIST List 9.253., n.p., Web. 20 Feb. 1998. 
 Jacobsen, Martin (editor). "Sum: Pronoun 'I'". LINGUIST List 9.253., n.p., Web. 20 Feb. 1998. 
 Mahoney, Nicole. "Language Change ". National Science Foundation. n.p. 12 July 2008. Web. 21 Dec. 2010
 Wells, Edward. "Further Elucidation on the Capitalization of 'I' in English".  (a paper in progress). Lingforum.com. n.p., Web. 25 Dec. 2010

Further reading

.

Self-reference
English words